Mitostylus is a genus of broad-nosed weevils in the beetle family Curculionidae. There are about seven described species in Mitostylus.

Species
These seven species belong to the genus Mitostylus:
 Mitostylus elongatus Van Dyke, 1936 i g b
 Mitostylus fragilis Sharp, 1891 c g
 Mitostylus glaucus Champion, 1911 c g
 Mitostylus gracilis Horn, 1894 c g
 Mitostylus scutellaris Sharp, 1911 c g
 Mitostylus setosus (Sharp, 1891) i c g b
 Mitostylus tenuis Horn, 1876 i c g b (broomweed broad-nosed weevil)
Data sources: i = ITIS, c = Catalogue of Life, g = GBIF, b = Bugguide.net

References

Further reading

 
 
 
 

Entiminae
Articles created by Qbugbot